Iron cash coins (Vietnamese: Thiết tiền) are a type of Chinese cash coin that were produced at various times during the monetary history of imperial China as well as in Japan and Vietnam. Iron cash coins were often produced in regions where the supply of copper was insufficient, or as a method of paying for high military expenditures at times of war, as well as for exports at times of trade deficits.

While the earlier recorded iron cash coins in Chinese history were Wu Zhu's (五銖, 118 BC–618 AD), the unearthing or iron Ban Liang (半兩) cash coins produced during the Western Han dynasty during the 1950s indicates that they may have been much older than first thought. The largest number of iron cash coins would be produced during the Song dynasty period as a result of a scarcity of copper and high military expenditures, among other reasons. The last government attempt at issuing iron cash coins occurred during the 1850s the under the reign of the Manchu Qing dynasty.

Iron cash coins were not exclusively produced by the Chinese, as other cash coin producing countries would also issue them under similar circumstances or by private mints. In Japan iron Kan'ei Tsūhō (寛永通寳) cash coins were produced by the Kamedo mint in the 1760s.

Overview 

Over the course of Chinese history a number of monarchs had tried to introduce iron cash coins to the market, but as their subjects never took to them, most of these attempts to issue them were rather short-lived. Sometimes bronze coins that were cast had a certain amount of iron in them, but in these cases the iron was not mixed into the copper-alloy itself, as it was just not removed during the production process, for example with some Warring States period round hole coins with the inscription "Yuan" (垣) which was made of about 30% iron. The mechanical strength of the cast coinages was thus reduced, but in the case of coins this was not as important as with tools as they did not serve any practical means other than their commodity value.

Iron cash coins were produced during the Han dynasty, Three Kingdoms period, Northern and Southern dynasties period, Five dynasties and Ten kingdoms period, Song dynasty, Jin dynasty (1115–1234), Western Xia dynasty, Ming dynasty, and Qing dynasty, but not during the Zhou dynasty, Jin dynasty (266–420), Sui dynasty, Tang dynasty, Liao dynasty, and Yuan dynasty periods.

Ban Liang cash coins

Western Han dynasty 

It is possible that China first began using iron cash coins during the Western Han dynasty, this was concluded after a number of iron Ban Liang (半兩) cash coins were unearthed in Western Han era tombs in the Hunanese cities of Hengyang and Changsha between the years 1955 and 1959. Other specimens of iron Ban Liang cash coins were also unearthed in the province of Sichuan.

Wu Zhu cash coins

Chengjia 

The Iron Wu Zhu's of Chengjia, which resemble the Western Han dynasty Wu Zhu coin, is attributed to Gongsun Shu, who rebelled in Sichuan in AD 25, and issued iron coins, two being equal to one Jian Wu Wu Zhu. Head of the zhu component rounded. Typical of Eastern Han Wu Zhu's. In AD 30, a ditty was sung by the youths of Sichuan: "The yellow bull! the white belly! Let Wu Zhu cash coins return". This ridiculed the tokens of Wang Mang and the iron coins of Gongsun Shu, which were withdrawn by the Eastern Han Emperor Guangwu in the 16th year of Jian Wu (AD 40). The Emperor was advised that the foundation of the wealth of a country depends on a good political economy, which was found in the good old Wu Zhu coinage, and so reissued the Wu Zhu cash coins.

Liang dynasty 

From the year 523 onwards the government of the Liang dynasty decided to cast iron Wu Zhu cash coins due to the fact that iron was both relatively easy and not expensive to acquire in what is today Sichuan. The iron cash coins issued by the Liang dynasty are quite distinctive from other iron cash coins as they have 4 lines that radiate outwards from each corner of the square center hole which is why they're referred to as "four corner coins" (四出錢, sì chū qián). As it became quite common for the people to cast iron cash coins privately based on these government issues it wasn't long before their quantities increased so drastically that it required cartloads of these iron Wu Zhu cash coins to pay for anything, even to this day these Wu Zhu's are quite common due to the widespread private production that plagued these iron issues. After them the Taiqing Fengle (太清豐樂, "Tai Qing Prosperous and Happy") cash coin was cast under the reign of Emperor Wu, these cash coins were actually believed to be Chinese numismatic charms until recently and were named after the Taiqing period (547-549).

The Five Dynasties and Ten Kingdoms

Kingdom of Min 

Issued by Wang Shenzhi:

 Kaiyuan Tongbao have a large dot above on the reverse side. They are made of iron and date from 922. The same coin cast in bronze is extremely rare.

Issued by Wang Yanxi:
 Yonglong Tongbao have the character Min on the reverse and comes from the Fujian region. There is a crescent below. It is made of iron and dates from 942. One of these large Yong Long coins was worth 10 small coins and 100 lead coins. A string of 500 of these poorly made Min iron coins were popularly called a kao.

Issued by Wang Yanzheng:

 Tiande Tongbao are made of iron. When Wang Yanzheng was proclaimed Emperor, he changed the name of the kingdom to Yin, but later restored the name of Min. One of these iron coins, which were cast in 944, was worth 100 ordinary cash.

Kingdom of Chu 

Supreme Commander Ma Yin:

 Tiance Fubao are made of iron. Ma Yin, originally a carpenter, was given the rank of Supreme Commander of Tiance, Hunan, by Emperor Zhu Wen of the Later Liang, and minted this coin in 911 to commemorate the event. Ma Yin later became King Wumu of Chu.
 Qianfeng Quanbao are made of iron. According to the histories, because there was much lead and iron in Hunan, Ma Yin took the advice of his minister Gao Yu to cast lead and iron coins at Changsha in 925. One of these was worth ten copper cash, and their circulation was confined to Changsha. Merchants traded in these coins, to the benefit of the State. In 2000, a hoard of over 3,000 of these coins was found near Changsha. Extremely rare bronze specimens are also known.

Later Shu 

 Guangzheng Tongbao are made of bronze and iron. The bronze coins were cast by Meng Chang from the beginning of this period, 938. In 956, iron coins began to be cast to cover additional military expenses. They circulated until 963.

Southern Tang Kingdom 

Emperor Yuan Zong (Li Jing) (943–961):

 Baoda Yuanbao has on the reverse the character tian above. They are made of iron and date between 943–957. There is also an extremely rare bronze example of this coin.

Song dynasty

Northern Song dynasty 

After the Song dynasty was done with "pacifying" Sichuan, the Emperor of the Song dynasty had the bronze cash coins that were circulating in the area sent back to the Song Chinese capital city. The bronze cash coins were then replaced with those cast of iron, this then caused the price of goods to soar in the region resulting in great hardship to the local populace.

In the year 978 an iron cash coin was worth  of a copper-alloy cash coin.

From the beginning of the dynasty, iron coins were extensively used in present-day Sichuan and Shaanxi where copper was not readily available. Between 976 and 984, a total of 100,000 strings of iron coins was produced in Fujian as well. In 993, for paying the land tax one iron coin was equal to one bronze, for the salary of clerks and soldiers one bronze equalled five iron coins, but in trade ten iron coins were needed for one bronze coin. In 1005, four mints in Sichuan produced over 500,000 strings of iron coins a year. This declined to 210,000 strings by the beginning of the Qingli period (1041). At this time, the mints were ordered to cast 3 million strings of iron cash to meet military expenses in Shaanxi. However, by 1056, casting was down to 100,000 strings a year, and in 1059 minting was halted for 10 years in Jiazhou and Qiongzhou, leaving only Xingzhou producing 30,000 strings a year.

During the Xining period (from 1068), minting was increased, and by the Yuanfeng period (from 1078) it was reported that there were nine iron coin mints, three in Sichuan and six in Shaanxi, producing over a million strings a year. Thereafter, output declined gradually.

Although the output of copper currency had expanded immensely by 1085, some fifty copper mines were shut down between the years 1078 and 1085. Although there were on average more copper mines found in Northern Song China than in the previous Tang dynasty, this case was reversed during the Southern Song with a sharp decline and depletion of mined copper deposits by 1165. Even though copper cash was abundant in the late 11th century, Chancellor Wang Anshi's tax substitution for corvée labor and government takeover of agricultural finance loans meant that people now had to find additional cash, driving up the price of copper money which would become scarce. To make matters worse, large amounts of government-issued copper currency exited the country via international trade, while the Liao dynasty and Western Xia actively pursued the exchange of their iron-minted coins for Song copper coins. As evidenced by an 1103 decree, the Song government became cautious about its outflow of iron currency into the Liao Empire when it ordered that the iron was to be alloyed with tin in the smelting process, thus depriving the Liao of a chance to melt down the currency to make iron weapons.

The government attempted to prohibit the use of copper currency in border regions and in seaports, but the Song-issued copper coin became common in the Liao, Western Xia, Japanese, and Southeast Asian economies. The Song government would turn to other types of material for its currency in order to ease the demand on the government mint, including the issuing of iron coinage and paper banknotes. In the year 976, the percentage of issued currency using copper coinage was 65%; after 1135, this had dropped significantly to 54%, a government attempt to debase the copper currency.

As a result of government corruption, a large number of iron cash coins were cast near the final years of Emperor Zhezong's reign.

Merchant guilds in the province of Sichuan were worldwide the first people to develop officially accepted letters of exchange, or paper money, in the forms of Jiaozi (交子), Qianyin (錢引), and Feiqian (飛錢), thess first forms of paper currency were provided with the security of iron cash coins.

Emperor Taizu (960–976) 

 Songyuan Tongbao.. Written in li script. The inscription is based on the Kaiyuan Tongbao series of cash coins. It has a nominal weight of 1 qian. Various dots and crescents are found on the reverse. It was first cast in 960 and then until the end of Emperor Taizu's reign. Casting of iron cash coins started at Baizhangxian, Yazhou, in Sichuan, from 970. Ten furnaces cast 9,000 strings a year.

Emperor Taizong (976–997) 

 Taiping Tongbao (976–989). Written in li script. Various dots and crescents are found on the reverse. There are also iron cash coins with this inscription. The small iron coins come from Sichuan and 10 were equivalent to one bronze coin. The large iron cash coin have a large dot above on the reverse. This coin was cast at Jianzhou, Fujian in 983, and was intended to be equivalent to 3 bronze coins.
 Chunhua Yuanbao (990–994). Written in regular, running, and grass script. There are also small and large iron coins. They have a nominal value of 10. In 991, 20,000 iron coins were needed in the market for one roll of silk. Permission was requested to alter the casting to Value Ten coins in the Imperial Script pattern. In one year only 3,000 strings were cast. They were not considered convenient, so casting was stopped.

Emperor Zhenzong (998–1022) 

 Xianping Yuanbao (998–1003). Written in regular script. They are found in both bronze and iron.
 Jingde Yuanbao (1004–1007). Written in regular script. They are made of bronze; Iron with Value Two; or Iron with Value Ten. The large iron cash coins were minted at Jiazhou and Qiongzhou in Sichuan in the year 1005. They weighed 4 qian each.
 Xiangfu Yuanbao (1008–1016). Written in regular script. They are made of bronze or iron. They come in medium size and large sizes. The large iron coins were cast from 1014 to 1016 in Yizhou, Sichuan. Their nominal value was 10 cash and weight 3.2 qian.
 Tianxi Tongbao (1017–1022). Written in regular script. They are made of bronze or iron. At this time, there were copper coin mints at Yongping in Jiangxi, Yongfeng in Anhui, Kuangning in Fujian, Fengguo in Shanxi, and in the capital city. There were also three iron coin mints in Sichuan.

Emperor Renzong (1022–1063) 

 Mingdao Yuanbao (1032–1033). Written in seal and regular script. There are also iron cash coins with this inscription.
 Jingyou Yuanbao (1034–1038). Written in seal and regular script. There are both small and large iron coins.
 Huangsong Tongbao (1039–1054) use seal and regular script, and have many variations. They are made of iron and have two forms with either small or large characters. The small character iron coins are associated with casting in Shaanxi and Shanxi in the Qing Li period (from 1044). The large character iron cash coins are associated with Sichuan mints. The histories say that the Huang Song coin was cast in Baoyuan 2 – 1039. As it is rather common, and there are no bronze small cash from the next three periods, it appears to have been issued for longer than one year.
 Kangding Yuanbao (1040). Written in li script. They are made of iron and come in both small and medium sizes.
 Qingli Zhongbao (1041–1048). Written in regular script. There are two forms: large bronze coins and large iron coins. The Qing Li large bronze coins, intended to be worth 10 cash, were cast in Jiangnan to fund the war with the Tangut Western Xia Empire. Iron coins were cast in Shanxi and other prefectures. The large cash coins caused prices to leap up, causing inflation, and both public and private interests suffered. In 1048, the large iron coins were devalued to 3 iron cash.

Southern Song dynasty 

The Southern Song dynasty saw the emergence of paper money, while coins were increasingly becoming a rarity. Iron cash coins also started to be used in greater numbers, at first due to the lack of copper, but later even as more copper was found the production of iron cash coins remained cheaper and an abundance of iron made it more attractive for the government to produce, while several problems such as the fact that iron is harder to inscribe, and that iron corrodes faster ensured the continued production of copper cash coins. From the year 1180 until the end of the Song dynasty very few bronze coins were produced by the government as the preference went to iron, this was because bronze cash coins needed to have a specific typeface which was more intricate to produce.

Qing dynasty 

During the second month of the year 1854 the government of the Qing dynasty supplemented the already debased Xianfeng coinage system with iron cash coins. The intrinsic value of iron cash coins was substantially lower than that of even the copper-alloy Zhiqian and Daqian. The aim the government had with the introduction of iron cash coins was to provide small change for a market that highly demanded it, as the Chinese market was already flooded with large denomination cash coinage and the Zhiqian 1 wén cash coins) by this point had become a rarity.

The denominations of the newly introduced iron cash coins included 1 wén, 5 wén, and 10 wén. The intrinsic value of the 1 wén iron cash coin represented a debasement of 70% compared to the copper-alloy 1 wén Zhiqian. The market price of iron in 1854 was 40 wén (in Zhiqian) per catty. A catty of iron could be cast into 133 1 wén iron cash coins, or 66 5 wén iron cash coins (which would have a total nominal value of 330 wén), or 53 10 wén iron cash coins (which would have a total nominal value of 530 wén). Disregarding the cost of manufacturing the Chinese itself, a 1 wén iron cash coin indicated a debasement of 70%. Iron cash coins were easily produced with iron scrap, which on the market cost 15 wén per catty in 1854.

While initially iron cash coins were mainly minted by the Ministry of Revenue mint and Ministry of Public Works mint in Beijing, afterwards the government of the Qing dynasty established a specific iron cash coins mint, known as the iron cash office (鐵錢局). The iron cash office also stored the iron cash coins. While the actual production numbers of iron cash coins remains unclear because of the limited entries about them in the records maintained by the Qing treasury, Peng Xinwei estimated, based on information he had gathered from Qing government memorials, that there had been an average annual production of 1,808,160 strings of iron cash coins between the year 1854 and 1855 and an annual production of 1,360,920 strings of iron cash coins during the years 1856 until 1859.

In January of the year 1855 the province of Zhili started casting iron cash coins, a trial casting for a single year was to deliver 120,000 strings of standard cash coins to be brought to Beijing. This work was then carried out by one of the Chinese branch mints with 10 furnaces that was located just outside of the western suburbs of Baoding by the Lingyu Temple (靈雲宮). In May of the year 1857, the four existing copper furnaces of the main Zhili provincial mint in Baoding were altered to be iron cash coin furnaces and a new iron cash coin furnace added, while at the same time 10 new furnaces for the production of iron cash coins was added to the Zhili branch mint. The Zhili provincial mint had ceased the production of 10 wén iron cash coins in June 1857.

Iron cash coin mints were also planned to be opened in the cities of Tianjin, Zhengding, and Daming for the production of 1 wén iron cash coins, but only Zhengding had established a mint for iron cash coins which had 10 furnaces in operation. In July of the year 1859 there were a total of 35 furnaces for the production of iron cash coins in the cities of Baoding and Zhengding and at that time around 1,000,000 strings of iron cash coins had been cast at both mints. Because the Chinese people weren't using iron cash coins it was reported that 30 furnaces in Zhengding (which presumably also includes the furnaces of the Zhili provincial branch mint) were to be closed. In November 1859, the remaining 5 iron cash coin furnaces situated in Baoding were also closed.

The function of iron cash coins was similar to that of Daqian, as it was primarily used as a way to continue paying the salaries of bannermen and other government workers. According to Qing government memorials, large amounts of iron cash coins were used as a means to pay salaries between the years 1856 and 1857 due to a noted justification that "the Chinese public was craving for small change". By the year 1856 the iron 10 wén cash coins were so much depreciated that they were dropped out of general circulation. From this point onwards only iron 1 wén cash coins would remain in general circulation, however, it was common for shops to deny them as a form of payment and there was extensive counterfeiting of iron cash coins, which further lowered the public's trust in them.

Only a single entry in the Qing government archive mentions them from this point, as it is stated that in the year 1856 the government of the Qing dynasty had 431,515.849 strings of iron cash coins deposited in the imperial treasury vault. This entry may be seen as supplementary evidence to suggest that copper-alloy cash coinage had almost completely disappeared in or before this year. Iron cash coins would soon become valueless and the coinage was ultimately suspended in the year 1859.

Hoards of iron cash coins

Iron cash coins museum 

In the city of Cangzhou there is a museum dedicated to the iron cash coins produced during the Song dynasty period known as the Tieqian Ku, which literally translates into English as either the "iron cash coins treasury" or "iron cash coins mint".

References

Sources 

 
 
 Peng Xinwei (彭信威) (1954 [2007]). Zhongguo huobi shi (中國貨幣史) (Shanghai: Qunlian chubanshe), 580–581, 597–605. (in Mandarin Chinese). 
 Peng Xinwei (彭信威) (1994) A monetary history of China (translated by Edward H. Kaplan). Western Washington University (Bellingham, Washington).

 
 

Coins of China
Chinese numismatics
Cash coins